Dębnik  is a village in the administrative district of Gmina Krzeszowice, within Kraków County, Lesser Poland Voivodeship, in southern Poland.

The village has a population of 114. Religions: Roman Catholicism, Jehovah's Witnesses (1%).

References

Villages in Kraków County